John Lucian Smith (December 26, 1914 – June 9, 1972) was an American Medal of Honor recipient and Marine Corps flying ace who, as commanding officer of VMF-223, shot down 19 Japanese planes in World War II and led his squadron to destroy a total of 83 enemy aircraft during the Solomon Islands campaign.

Early life
John Lucian Smith was born on December 26, 1914, in Lexington, Oklahoma. He attended the University of Oklahoma where he was a member of the Reserve Officers Training Corps, graduating in May 1936. During the same month, he was appointed a second lieutenant in the Army Field Artillery, but resigned in July that year to accept a commission in the United States Marine Corps as a second lieutenant.

Marine aviator

After receiving his Marine Corps commission, he was ordered to Marine Barracks, Navy Yard, Philadelphia, Pennsylvania, where he attended the Marine Basic School.

Following various duty assignments at Quantico, Virginia, Washington, D.C., and Marine Corps Recruit Depot Parris Island, South Carolina, in 1937, he was transferred to the Naval Air Station, Pensacola in July 1938 to begin flight training. A year later he graduated and was designated a Naval Aviator.

During the crucial battle for the Solomons, he led Marine Fighter Squadron 223 (VMF-223) on sorties against the enemy, during which the squadron accounted for 83 enemy aircraft destroyed.

Aerial victory credits

While on temporary duty in Washington after his return from the Pacific, he was presented the Medal of Honor by President Franklin D. Roosevelt on February 24, 1943.

After several months' duty in Washington, he served as executive officer of Marine Aircraft Group 32, then located at Oahu, Hawaii. A few months later, he moved to the Philippines and took part in the aerial offensives in the Bismarck Archipelago in November and December 1944; moved up to Luzon in the Philippines in January and February 1945; then on to Mindoro and Mindanao, and finally up to the Sulu Archipelago.

For his services in the Philippines during the period November 1944 to June 1945, he was awarded the Legion of Merit for exceedingly meritorious conduct in the performance of outstanding service as executive officer for Marine Aircraft Group 32 in extensive support of ground and surface forces in the liberation of Luzon, Zamboanga Peninsula, the Sulu Archipelago, and Mindanao.

After his return to the United States in June 1945, he served at the Naval Air Station, Jacksonville, Florida, until December 1945, and then was transferred to Quantico, Virginia, to serve as station operations officer. After his duty there and after performing various duties at Cherry Point, North Carolina, Washington, D.C., and Havana, Cuba, in 1946 and 1947, he was detached from duty at the Naval Air Station, Norfolk, Virginia, to perform duty involving flying on the staff of commander, air force, Atlantic Fleet. In November 1948 he was on temporary aviation duty in England, France, and Germany.

Lieutenant Colonel Smith was detailed as Marine Corps Aide to the Chief of Naval Operations, Navy Department, Washington, in December 1949; promoted to colonel on January 1, 1951; and in May 1951, he joined the Staff, Standing Group, of the North Atlantic Treaty Organization, for two years. Following duty with Marine Training Group 10, at the Marine Corps Air Station El Toro, California, he began a year's duty in Korea in July 1953. He served first as commanding officer, Marine Aircraft Group 33, until February 1954, then as assistant chief of staff, G-4 of 1st Marine Aircraft Wing.

Upon his return from Korea, Smith was assigned to Headquarters Marine Corps in August 1954, and entered the National War College, completing the course in June 1955. The following month he was assigned to Marine Corps Schools, Quantico, as a member of the Advanced Research Group, serving in this capacity until July 1956. That August he assumed his duties at Pensacola Naval Air Station as liaison officer on the staff of the chief of Naval Air Training.

Colonel Smith retired from the Marine Corps on September 1, 1960, after which he worked in the defense industry until his suicide on June 9, 1972, in Encino, California. He is buried in Arlington National Cemetery.

Awards and decorations

A complete list of Smith's medals and decorations includes: the Medal of Honor; the Legion of Merit with Combat "V;" the Distinguished Flying Cross; the Bronze Star  with Combat "V;" the Air Medal with three Gold Stars, indicative of four awards; the Navy Presidential Unit Citation; the Navy Unit Commendation Ribbon with one bronze star; the American Defense Service Medal with Base clasp; the Asiatic-Pacific Campaign Medal with one silver star, indicative of five bronze stars; the American Campaign Medal; the World War II Victory Medal; the Navy Occupation Service Medal with European clasp; the National Defense Service Medal; Distinguished Service Order; the Korean Service Medal with one bronze star; the United Nations Service Medal; the Philippine Liberation Ribbon with one bronze star; the Philippine Presidential Unit Citation; and the Korean Presidential Unit Citation.

Smith was featured on the cover of the 7 December 1942 issue of Life Magazine.

Medal of Honor citation

The President of the United States takes pleasure in presenting the MEDAL OF HONOR to

for service as set forth in the following CITATION:

For conspicuous gallantry and heroic achievement in aerial combat above and beyond the call of duty as Commanding Officer of Marine Fighting Squadron TWO TWENTY-THREE, during operations against enemy Japanese forces in the Solomon Islands Area, August – September, 1942. Repeatedly risking his life in aggressive and daring attacks, Major Smith led his squadron against a determined force, greatly superior in numbers, personally shooting down sixteen Japanese planes between August 21 and September 15, 1942. In spite of the limited combat experience of many of the pilots of this squadron, they achieved the notable record of a total of eighty-three enemy aircraft destroyed in this period, mainly attributable to the thorough training under Major Smith and to his intrepid and inspiring leadership. His bold tactics and indomitable fighting spirit and the valiant and zealous fortitude of the men of his command not only rendered the enemy's attacks ineffective and costly to them but contributed to the security of our advance base. His loyal and courageous devotion to duty sustain and enhance the finest traditions of the United States Naval Service.

/S/ FRANKLIN D. ROOSEVELT

See also
Cactus Air Force – VMF-223, with Smith in command, was a part of the Cactus Air Force based out of Henderson Field on Guadalcanal.

References

Bibliography

External links

1914 births
1972 deaths
United States Marine Corps personnel of World War II
United States Marine Corps personnel of the Korean War
American World War II flying aces
Aviators from Oklahoma
Burials at Arlington National Cemetery
People from Lexington, Oklahoma
Recipients of the Legion of Merit
Recipients of the Distinguished Flying Cross (United States)
Recipients of the Air Medal
United States Marine Corps Medal of Honor recipients
United States Marine Corps colonels
United States Marine Corps pilots of World War II
United States Naval Aviators
University of Oklahoma alumni
World War II recipients of the Medal of Honor
Suicides in California
American military personnel who committed suicide